Charitha Pattiaratchi (Sinhala: චරිත පට්ටිආරච්චි , Tamil: சரித பட்டிஆரச்சி)  is a  Winthrop Professor of coastal oceanography at the University of Western Australia. He leads the UWA Coastal Oceanography Group. and the IMOS Australian National Facility for Ocean Gliders. He has played an active role in research related in understanding climate change effects in the regions of coastal Western Australia and specifically in terms wind and wave climate, ocean currents, coastal flooding, sea level variability and beach stability. The research programs he has developed involves ocean observation integration, numerical modelling and synthesis to define the role of physical processes in pathways of water and sediment (including morphological changes) weather and climate and ecosystem in the coastal ocean and the adjacent deep ocean.

Education 
Pattiaratchi holds Bachelors, Masters and PhD degrees from the University College of Swansea, University of Wales, UK.

Awards and honours 

Vice-chancellor's inaugural senior research award (2014)
Kevin Stark memorial award for excellence in coastal and ocean engineering (2011)
Eminent Sri Lankan scientist award (2001)

Selected bibliography

Articles

Papers & Publications 
 https://uwa.academia.edu/CharithaPattiaratchi
 https://research-repository.uwa.edu.au/en/persons/charitha-pattiaratchi/publications/
 https://publons.com/researcher/2786539/charitha-b-pattiaratchi/
 https://loop.frontiersin.org/people/137781/publications
 https://www.scopus.com/authid/detail.uri?authorId=7003884923
 https://www.mendeley.com/profiles/charitha-pattiaratchi/publications/

References 

Living people
Year of birth missing (living people)
Alumni of Swansea University
Academic staff of the University of Western Australia
Australian people of Sri Lankan descent
Sri Lankan environmentalists